Russian Karaites may refer to:

Crimean Karaites in Russian Empire and modern Russia
Subbotnik Jews, adherents of Karaite Judaism